Wakea madinika is a species of frogs in the mantellid subfamily Mantellinae. It is the only species in the monotypic genus Wakea. It is endemic to Madagascar.

Discovery
Wakea madinika reaches males  snout-vent length and females  length, is thereby the smallest species in the family Mantellidae

Taxonomy
This species was originally described as a member of the genus Mantidactylus, but was transferred to its own genus in 2006.

References

Mantellidae
Endemic fauna of Madagascar
Frogs of Africa
Amphibians described in 2002

Taxonomy articles created by Polbot